Tuesday Weld (born Susan Ker Weld; August 27, 1943) is an American actress and model. She began acting as a child and progressed to mature roles in the late 1950s. She won a Golden Globe Award for Most Promising Female Newcomer in 1960. Over the following decade, she established a career playing dramatic roles in films.

Weld often portrayed impulsive and reckless women acting out sexually, and was nominated for a Golden Globe for Play It as It Lays (1972), an Academy Award for Best Supporting Actress for Looking for Mr. Goodbar (1977), an Emmy Award for The Winter of Our Discontent (1983), and a BAFTA for Once Upon a Time in America (1984). Since the late 1980s her acting appearances have been infrequent.

Background and family
Weld was born Susan Ker Weld in Manhattan on August 27, 1943. Her father was Lathrop Motley Weld, of the Weld family of Massachusetts. Her father died in 1947 at the age of 49, shortly before his daughter's fourth birthday. Her mother, Yosene Balfour Ker, daughter of the artist and Life illustrator William Balfour Ker, was Lathrop Weld's fourth and last wife.  Canadian-born William Balfour Ker had Scottish ancestry. His mother, Lily Florence Bell Ker, was first cousin of the inventor Alexander Graham Bell, and his father, William Ker, was a Scottish businessman and banker.

Weld had two siblings, Sarah King Weld and David Balfour Weld. She legally changed her name to Tuesday Weld on October 9, 1959.

Career

Modeling
Left in financial difficulty by her husband's death, Weld's mother put Weld to work as a model to support the family. As the young actress told Life in 1971:
My father's family came from Tuxedo Park, and they offered to take us kids and pay for our education, on the condition that Mama never see us again. Mama was an orphan who had come here from London but so far as my father's family was concerned, she was strictly from the gutter. I have to give Mama credit—she refused to give us up… So I became the supporter of the family, and I had to take my father's place in many, many ways. I was expected to make up for everything that had ever gone wrong in Mama's life. She became obsessed with me, pouring out her pent-up love—her alleged love—on me, and it's been heavy on my shoulders ever since. Mama still thinks I owe everything to her.
Her name became Tuesday, an extension of her childhood nickname, "Tu-Tu", so named by her young cousin, Mary Ker, who could not pronounce "Susan". She officially adopted her name in October 1959.

Acting
Weld's mother secured her an agent using her résumé from modeling. She made her acting debut on television at the age of 12, and her feature film debut that year in a bit role in the 1956 Alfred Hitchcock crime drama The Wrong Man.

In 1956 Weld played the lead in Rock, Rock, Rock, which featured record promoter Alan Freed and singers Chuck Berry, Frankie Lymon, and Johnny Burnette. In the film Connie Francis performed the vocals for Weld's singing parts.

On TV she appeared in an episode of Goodyear Playhouse, "Backwoods Cinderella". She understudied on Broadway in The Dark at the Top of the Stairs.

Weld was cast in a supporting role in the Paul Newman–Joanne Woodward comedy Rally Round the Flag, Boys! (1958), made by 20th Century Fox. At Paramount Pictures, Weld was in The Five Pennies (1959), playing the daughter of Danny Kaye, who called Weld "15 going on 27". She guest-starred a number of times on The Adventures of Ozzie and Harriet (1958–59). She appeared in 77 Sunset Strip with Efrem Zimbalist Jr., in the 1959 episode, "Secret Island".

20th Century Fox
Weld's performance in Rally 'Round the Flag, Boys! impressed executives at Fox, who signed her to a long-term contract. They cast her in the CBS television series The Many Loves of Dobie Gillis, with a salary of $35,000 for one year. Weld played Thalia Menninger, the love interest of Dobie Gillis (played by Dwayne Hickman), whose rivals for Thalia's affection included Milton Armitage (played by Warren Beatty). Although Weld was a cast member for only one season, the show created considerable national publicity for her, and she was named a co-winner of a "Most Promising Newcomer" award at the Golden Globe Awards.

At Columbia, she had a leading role in a teen film, Because They're Young (1960), starring Dick Clark. She was second billed in Sex Kittens Go to College (1960) made by Albert Zugsmith at Allied Artists. She made a second film for Zugsmith, The Private Lives of Adam and Eve, made in 1959 but not released for two years.

She guest starred on The Red Skelton Hour in "Appleby: The Big Producer" (1959) and on 77 Sunset Strip (1959) and The Millionaire (1960).

At Fox, she played Joy, a free-spirited university student in High Time, starring Bing Crosby and Fabian Forte. She sang a love song to Fabian in the season opener of NBC's The Dinah Shore Chevy Show on October 9, 1960. Four weeks later, on November 13, Weld returned to the network as a guest star in NBC's The Tab Hunter Show. She guested in "The Mormons" for Zane Grey Theatre (1960).

For Fox, Weld had a supporting role in the sequel Return to Peyton Place (1961), in the part played by Hope Lange in the original. Her portrayal of an incest victim was well received, but the film was less successful than its predecessor. She supported Elvis Presley in Wild in the Country (1962), along with Lange. Weld had an off-screen romance with Presley.

Fox also used her as a guest star on Follow the Sun ("The Highest Wall") and Adventures in Paradise ("The Velvet Trap"). On November 12, 1961, she played a singer, Cherie, in the seventh episode of ABC's television series Bus Stop, produced by Fox, with Marilyn Maxwell and Gary Lockwood. It was an adaptation of the play by William Inge, with Weld in the role originated on screen by Marilyn Monroe.

Weld supported Terry-Thomas in the Frank Tashlin comedy Bachelor Flat (1962), for Fox. Following the film's release, she appeared on What's My Line as the celebrity mystery guest.

Weld's mother was scandalized by her teen daughter's love affairs with older men, such as actor John Ireland, but Weld resisted, saying, If you don't leave me alone, I'll quit being an actress—which means there ain't gonna be no more money for you, Mama'. Finally, when I was sixteen, I left home. I just went out the door and bought my own house".

She was Stanley Kubrick's first choice to play the role of Lolita in his 1962 film, but she turned the offer down, saying: "I didn't have to play it. I was Lolita".

Weld took three months off to go to Greenwich Village in New York and "study myself". Then she starred along with Jackie Gleason and Steve McQueen in Soldier in the Rain, written by Blake Edwards from a novel by William Goldman, but the film was only a minor success.

She won excellent reviews for a February 7, 1962, episode in the Naked City, "A Case Study of Two Savages", adapted from the real-life case of backwood killers Charles Starkweather (played by Rip Torn) and Weld, cast as his young bride, Ora Mae Youngham, on a homicidal spree ending in New York City. She guest starred on Route 66 in "Love Is a Skinny Kid" (1962), Ben Casey in "When You See an Evil Man" (1962), The Dick Powell Theatre in "A Time to Die" (1962), and "Run Till It's Dark" with Fabian (1962).

In 1963 Weld guest-starred as Denise Dunlear in The Eleventh Hour, in the episode "Something Crazy's Going on in the Back Room" alongside Angela Lansbury. She was in "The Legend of Lylah Clare" for The DuPont Show of the Week (1963), directed by Franklin J. Schaffner.

In 1964 she appeared in the title role of the episode "Keep an Eye on Emily" on Craig Stevens's CBS drama, Mr. Broadway. In the same year, she appeared as a troubled blind woman in "Dark Corner", an episode of The Fugitive.

She appeared with her former co-star Dwayne Hickman in Heck Palance's circus drama The Greatest Show on Earth on ABC, in separate episodes. 

Weld supported Bob Hope in the comedy I'll Take Sweden (1965).

Stardom
Weld appeared in 1965 in the successful Norman Jewison film The Cincinnati Kid, opposite Steve McQueen. There was some controversy when she refused to meet the local governor at a fund-raiser for hurricane victims, jumping out of a car in view of 70,000 people. The film was a big hit.

Weld got a star role in Lord Love a Duck (1966), with Roddy McDowall, Ruth Gordon, and Harvey Korman. Weld received excellent reviews, but the film was a box office disappointment.

She followed it playing Abigail in a TV adaptation of The Crucible (1967), opposite George C. Scott and Colleen Dewhurst. After guest starring on Cimarron Strip (1967), Weld had the starring role in Pretty Poison (1968), co-starring Anthony Perkins. The film became a cult success, but she disliked the film and did not get on with director Noel Black.

Around this time, Weld became famous for turning down roles in films that succeeded at the box office, such as Bonnie and Clyde, Rosemary's Baby, True Grit, Cactus Flower, and Bob & Carol & Ted & Alice. In a 1971 interview with the New York Times, Weld explained that she had chosen to reject these roles precisely because she believed they would be commercial successes: "Do you think I want a success? I refused 'Bonnie and Clyde' because I was nursing at the time, but also because deep down I knew it was going to be a huge success. The same was true of 'Bob and Carol and Fred and Sue' or whatever it was called. It reeked of success".

The films Weld did make included I Walk the Line (1970), opposite Gregory Peck; A Safe Place (1971), co-starring Jack Nicholson and Orson Welles and directed by Henry Jaglom, and Play It as It Lays (1972), again with Perkins, for which she was nominated for a Golden Globe Award.

Peak years of success
Weld began to work again in television, starring in Reflections of Murder (1974) and F. Scott Fitzgerald in Hollywood (1975) in which she played Zelda Fitzgerald.

Weld attracted attention as the favored, out-of-control Katherine in Looking for Mr. Goodbar (1977) – packing into her short screen time an orgy, a divorce, a lot of alcohol, and two abortions – and was nominated for an Academy Award for Best Supporting Actress; later she appeared in Who'll Stop the Rain (1978) opposite Nick Nolte; and the ensemble satire Serial (1980).

She said she preferred television. "What I dig about TV is the pace", she said. "Two weeks for even a heavy part – great. Too much thinking about a role is a disaster for me. I mean, let's do it, let's get it done."

She played the lead in the TV films A Question of Guilt (1978), in which she plays a woman accused of murdering her children, Mother and Daughter: The Loving War (1980), a remake of Madame X (1981), and a new version of The Rainmaker (1982).

In feature films, Weld had a good supporting role in Michael Mann's acclaimed 1981 film Thief, opposite James Caan. She played Al Pacino's wife in Author! Author! (1982) and co-starred with Donald Sutherland in the TV film The Winter of Our Discontent (1983). This performance earned her an Emmy nomination.

In 1984, she appeared in Sergio Leone's gangster epic Once Upon a Time in America, playing a jeweler's secretary, who is in on a plan to steal a shipment of diamonds. During the robbery, her character goads Robert De Niro's character, David "Noodles" Aaronson, into "raping" her with her complicity. She later meets up with the gang from the robbery, and becomes the moll of James Woods' character Max Bercovicz. Disturbed by what she sees as Max's delusional, even suicidal, ambitions, she convinces Noodles to betray Max to the police. The performance earned Weld a BAFTA nomination for Best Supporting Actress of 1984.

On TV, Weld was in Scorned and Swindled (1984), Circle of Violence (1986) and Something in Common (1986). She had a supporting role in Heartbreak Hotel (1988).

Later career
Weld was reunited with Anthony Perkins in an episode of Mistress of Suspense (1990).

In 1993, she played a police officer's neurotic wife  in Falling Down, starring Michael Douglas and Robert Duvall. She had small supporting roles in Feeling Minnesota (1996), Investigating Sex (2001), and Chelsea Walls (2001).

Personal life
Weld has been married three times. She was married to screenwriter Claude Harz from October 23, 1965, until their divorce on February 18, 1971. They had a daughter, Natasha, born on August 26, 1966. Weld was awarded custody of Natasha in the divorce and $100 a month in child support payments. Weld told Guy Flatley of The New York Times in 1971:

Mama hated my husband—she's a jealous lover, you know. She's hated all the men I've ever been involved with. But I really felt that what I had been doing up to that time with my life was probably wrong, that maybe what I should be was a housewife. Our marriage lasted 5 years. It was just another one of my mistakes.

She married British actor, musician and comedian Dudley Moore on September 20, 1975. On February 26, 1976, they had a son, Patrick. The couple divorced in 1980, with Weld receiving a $200,000 settlement plus $3,000 monthly alimony for the next 4 years and an additional $2,500 a month in child support.

On October 18, 1985, she married Israeli concert violinist and conductor Pinchas Zukerman, becoming stepmother to his daughters Arianna and Natalia. The couple divorced in 1998. In court papers, Zukerman quoted Weld as saying, "Why do I need to go to another concert when I’ve heard the piece before?" and "I can’t stand the backstage scene. I don’t want to hear another note."

Between marriages, Weld dated Al Pacino, David Steinberg, Mikhail Baryshnikov (whose previous girlfriend, Jessica Lange, had been Weld's best friend), Omar Sharif, Richard Gere and Ryan O'Neal.

Weld sold her beach house in Montauk, New York, in the late 2000s and moved to Carbondale, Colorado. In 2018, she left Colorado and bought a $1.8 million home in the Hollywood Hills.

Montauk house
Weld and then-husband Zukerman purchased 74 Surfside Ave in 1990 from the estate of Norman Kean, who produced the long-running Broadway show Oh! Calcutta! and who killed himself and his actress wife Gwyda Donhowe in their Manhattan apartment in 1988. Although the Montauk residence was not a crime scene, Weld later struggled to find a buyer for the property due to its murder-suicide connection. Listed in 2006, it sat on the market for three years before selling at a reduced price of $6.75 million in 2009 and is now rented. Weld bought a "tiny condo" there in 2021 for $335,000.

Popular culture influence
Offhand references to Weld sometimes appear in fiction and music. Some works, though, have been more directly inspired by her:

 In The Flintstones episode "The Monster from the Tar Pits", the Bedrock Airport P.A. announces: "That popular new starlet, Wednesday Tuesday! Or is it, 'Tuesday Wednesday'?" Fred then shouts at her: "Hey, Wednesday Tuesday, what are ya doin' Saturday?!"
 Weld is mentioned among other sixties cultural touchstones in the song "Ain't Got No (Reprise)" from the 1968 musical Hair.
 In The Odd Couple episode "And Leave the Greyhound to Us?", Oscar asks Felix rhetorically if he knows what Oscar's dream is. Felix answers: "You and Tuesday Weld as the sole survivors of a nuclear holocaust."
 Stephen Coates named his lounge swing band The Real Tuesday Weld.
 The cover of Matthew Sweet's album Girlfriend features a photo of Weld. Originally called Nothing Lasts, the album was retitled after Weld objected. Sweet's greatest hits compilation Time Capsule features photos of Weld on the front and back covers.
 Walter Egan's album The Last Stroll includes the song "Tuesday Weld".
 Weld was the inspiration for the song "Groovy Tuesday" by Swan Dive.
 Weld is referenced in the lyrics to "New Frontier," the fifth track on Donald Fagen's 1982 album The Nightfly.
 In the American Horror Story episode "Asylum", Lana Winters (Sarah Paulson) mentions Weld and expresses her wish to Kit Walker (Evan Peters) to have Weld play her in a film about Winter's life.
 Charles Bukowski mentions her in the poem "The best way to get famous is to run away".
 In the Two and a Half Men episode "Does This Smell Funny to You", Norman (Orson Bean) claims Weld was one of his romantic conquests.
 Weld is mentioned in Tiny Tim's cover of George Cohan's song "Then I'd Be Satisfied With Life" from the album God Bless Tiny Tim.

Filmography

Television

References

External links

 
 
 

1943 births
Living people
20th-century American actresses
21st-century American actresses
Actresses from New York City
American film actresses
American stage actresses
American television actresses
American people of Scottish descent
New Star of the Year (Actress) Golden Globe winners
People from Manhattan